Andrei or Andrey Bogdanov may refer to:
 Andrei Ivanovich Bogdanov (1692–1766), Russian bibliographer and ethnographer
 Andrei Vladimirovich Bogdanov (born 1970), leader of the Russian Communist Party of Social Justice
 Andrei Bogdanov (luger) (born 1992), Russian luger
 Andrey Bogdanov (swimmer) (1958–1999), Russian swimmer